Hernán Espinosa (16 May 1916 – 6 June 1991) was a Spanish equestrian. He competed at the 1956 Summer Olympics and the 1960 Summer Olympics.

References

External links
 

1916 births
1991 deaths
Spanish male equestrians
Olympic equestrians of Spain
Equestrians at the 1956 Summer Olympics
Equestrians at the 1960 Summer Olympics
Sportspeople from San Sebastián